Yanguznarat (Yañğıźnarat) is a rural locality (a village) in Novokainlykovsky Selsoviet, Krasnokamsky District, Bashkortostan, Russia. The population was 136 as of 2010. There are 4 streets.

Geography 
Yanguznarat is located 61 km south of Nikolo-Beryozovka (the district's administrative centre) by road. Stary Kainlyk is the nearest rural locality.

References 

Rural localities in Krasnokamsky District